Aleksandar Lyubenov (born 11 February 1995) is a Bulgarian footballer who plays as a goalkeeper for Lokomotiv Sofia.

At international level, Lyubenov captained the U-19 Bulgarian national team at the Euro 2014 in Hungary.

Career
Born in Bankya, part of Greater Sofia,  Lyubenov began playing football for local side Levski Sofia. He grew through all youth garnitures in the club.

Lyubenov made his first team debut in a 2–1 league home win against Botev Plovdiv on 17 August 2014.

After short spells with Septemvri Simitli, Lokomotiv Plovdiv and Lokomotiv Sofia, on 12 June 2017, Lyubenov signed a 3-year contract with his hometown club Levski Sofia.

Career statistics

Club

References

External links
 Profile at levski.bg
 
 Profile at LevskiSofia.info

1995 births
Living people
Bulgarian footballers
Association football goalkeepers
First Professional Football League (Bulgaria) players
PFC Levski Sofia players
FC Septemvri Simitli players
PFC Lokomotiv Plovdiv players
FC Lokomotiv 1929 Sofia players
FC Botev Vratsa players
FC Hebar Pazardzhik players